The Republican Party, early named Liberian Party, was a political party founded soon after the founding of Liberia in 1848. It was known to be made up primarily of Americo-Liberians who had mixed African and European ancestry. Its main opponent was the True Whig Party.

The first President of Liberia, Joseph Jenkins Roberts, supported the party, which had the first candidates elected to office in the independent nation.  The party weakened soon after the death of Roberts. After the end of President James Spriggs Payne's term in 1878, the election of Anthony W. Gardiner to the presidency marked the beginning of nearly a century of True Whig Party dominance in Liberian politics. In 1899, the Republican Party disappeared.

Electoral history

Presidential elections

References

Americo-Liberian organizations
Defunct political parties in Liberia
Political parties established in 1848
Political parties disestablished in 1899